Noordwijk is the name of several communities in the Netherlands:

 Noordwijk, municipality in South Holland, including the towns:
 Noordwijk-Binnen
 Noordwijk aan Zee
 Noordwijkerhout
 Noordwijk, Drenthe, hamlet in Drenthe province
 Noordwijk, Groningen, small village in Groningen province

See also
 Noordwyk, suburb of Johannesburg, South Africa